The 1994 Toshiba Classic was a women's tennis tournament played on outdoor hard courts in San Diego, California in the United States that was part of Tier II of the 1994 WTA Tour. It was the 16th edition of the tournament and was held from August 1 through August 7, 1994. First-seeded Steffi Graf won the singles title, her fourth at the event.

Finals

Singles

 Steffi Graf defeated  Arantxa Sánchez Vicario, 6–2, 6–1
 It was Graf's 7th singles title of the year and the 86th of her career.

Doubles

 Jana Novotná /  Arantxa Sánchez Vicario defeated  Ginger Helgeson /  Rachel McQuillan, 6–3, 6–3

References

External links
 ITF tournament edition details
 Tournament draws

Toshiba Classic
Southern California Open
Toshiba Classic
1994 in American tennis